Seindon Mibaya (1840 – 15 May 1905), known by her royal title, Thiri Pobba Yadana Dewi, was a senior queen consort of King Mindon during the Konbaung dynasty. Being a cousin of King Mindon, she was promoted to a Nanzwe Mibaya and received the appanage of Seindon when he ascended the throne.

Life
Seindon Mibaya was born as Shin Thet in 1840 to parents Le-u Bo U Sai and Arla Kappa Myosa, the sister of King Mindon's mother, Chandra Mata Mahe. She has one younger sibling, Prince Tapal. She is also a cousin of King Mindon. She did not bear any issue.

In 1878, she was imprisoned for failing to provide a list of the gold, silver, and royal gifts given by King Mindon after his deification. After the passing of King Mindon, to avoid the beset caused by Queen Hsinbyumashin faction in Upper Burma, she took refuge in Moulmein (now Mawlamyine), then British owned Lower Burma. There, she established the Yadanabonmyint Monastery (ရတနာဘုံမြင့်ကျောင်း). Later, she joined the Buddhist order of nun in Moulmein before she died on 15 May 1905.

Notes

References

See also 

 Konbaung dynasty
 List of Burmese consorts

Konbaung dynasty
Burmese Buddhists
Queens consort of Konbaung dynasty
1905 deaths
1840 births